José Luis Salcedo Bastardo (15 March 1926 – 16 February 2005) was a Venezuelan historian and diplomat.  He was born in Carúpano, and died in Caracas.

References
 José Luis Salcedo Bastardo
 José Luis Salcedo Bastardo. “Un hombre diáfano Bolívar”. Caracas – Venezuela. Cultural venezolana, S.A. 1977.

20th-century Venezuelan lawyers
20th-century Venezuelan historians
1926 births
2005 deaths
Venezuelan Ministers of Technology
Venezuelan Ministers of Science
Secretariat of the Presidency ministers of Venezuela